Devarakonda Assembly constituency is a ST reserved constituency of the Telangana Legislative Assembly, India. It is one of 12 constituencies in erstwhileNalgonda district. It is part of Nalgonda Lok Sabha constituency.

Ravindra Kumar, the MLA of TRS in Telangana Legislative Assembly is representing the constituency.

Mandals
The Assembly Constituency presently comprises the following Mandals:

Members of Legislative Assembly

Election results

Telangana Legislative Assembly election, 2018

Telangana Legislative Assembly election, 2014

Andhra pradesh Legislative Assembly election, 2009

Andhra pradesh Legislative Assembly election, 2004

Andhra pradesh Legislative Assembly election, 1999

Andhra pradesh Legislative Assembly election, 1994

See also
 List of constituencies of Telangana Legislative Assembly
 Devarakonda

References

Assembly constituencies of Telangana
Assembly constituencies of Nalgonda district